Trà Lĩnh is a former district of Cao Bằng province in the Northeast region of Vietnam. As of 2009, the district had a population of 21,558. The district covers an area of 257 km2. The district capital lies at Hùng Quốc.

Trà Lĩnh district was subdivided to 10 commune-level subdivisions, including Hùng Quốc township (district capital) and the rural communes of: Tri Phương, Cô Mười, Quang Hán, Quang Vinh, Lưu Ngọc, Cao Chương, Quốc Toản, Xuân Nội and Quang Trung.

On February 11, 2020, the district was annexed by Trùng Khánh district.

Border crossing
There is a border crossing into China. The town on the opposite side is Longbang.

References

Former districts of Vietnam
China–Vietnam border crossings